Mount Spencer is a  peak in the Sierra Nevada, in Kings Canyon National Park and Fresno County, California.

It is named for Herbert Spencer, an English philosopher and prominent scientist in the field of evolution who coined the term "survival of the fittest."  Other nearby mountains in the Evolution Group include Mount Darwin, Mount Mendel, Mount Fiske, Mount Haeckel, Mount Huxley, Mount Wallace, and Mount Lamarck. The area around the peaks, known as the Evolution Region, includes Evolution Basin and Evolution Valley.

Although it is not a very well known peak, it offers a picturesque view from Evolution Lake and the John Muir Trail.

Climate
According to the Köppen climate classification system, Mount Spencer is located in an alpine climate zone. Most weather fronts originate in the Pacific Ocean, and travel east toward the Sierra Nevada mountains. As fronts approach, they are forced upward by the peaks, causing them to drop their moisture in the form of rain or snowfall onto the range (orographic lift). Precipitation runoff from this mountain drains to Evolution Creek which is a San Joaquin River tributary.

References

Mountains of Kings Canyon National Park
Mountains of Fresno County, California
Mountains of Northern California
North American 3000 m summits
Sierra Nevada (United States)